The General Centre of Independent and Free Unions of Angola (CGSILA) is a national trade union centre of Angola.  With a membership of 50,000, it is led by Manuel Maria Difuila as President.

References

External links
 www.icftu.org entry in ITUC address book.

Trade unions in Angola
African Regional Organisation of the International Trade Union Confederation
National federations of trade unions
Trade unions established in 1996